Tammy K. Bruce (born August 20, 1962) is an American conservative radio host, author, and political commentator. Earlier she had been president of the Los Angeles chapter of the National Organization for Women. She is currently an on-air contributor to Fox News and host of Get Tammy Bruce on Fox Nation.

Career
Bruce holds a bachelor's degree in political science from the University of Southern California.

For seven years, Bruce served as president of the Los Angeles chapter of the National Organization for Women (NOW) (1990–1996). She was the youngest woman at the time to lead a major chapter of NOW.

Bruce served two years on NOW's board of directors, but later criticized the organization in one of her books. During the early 1990s, she spearheaded the campaign to publicly criticize the sexualized violence in the novel American Psycho, and led an effort to boycott all titles by the book's publisher, Knopf, for a year.

In 1995, responding to the verdict in the O. J. Simpson murder trial, Bruce said "What we need to teach our children is... not about racism, but is about violence against women″ and that her message to Simpson was "You are not welcome here, you are not welcome in this country, you are not welcome on our airwaves, you are not welcome in our culture." She also refused to discuss the issue on a talk show, reportedly saying "I don’t have time to argue with a bunch of black women; we’ve moved beyond that." The NOW Executive Board voted to censure her for what it called these "racially insensitive comments". In May 1996, Bruce resigned as president of Los Angeles NOW. Bruce claimed that the censure was due to her focus on domestic violence, as opposed to defense attorney Johnnie Cochran's "racial issues" trial argument. Since then, Bruce has written about the dispute in her critique on what she sees as the failings of NOW and the political left in general. She has said that the feminist establishment in the U.S. has abandoned authentic feminism. Bruce resigned from NOW five months later, in May 1996. She launched a new organization, the Women’s Progress Alliance with Denise Brown, the sister of Nicole Brown Simpson, saying “We both have been controversial, and we both will remain controversial."

In 1997, she hosted an overnight weekend talk show on KFI. Bruce hosted a national radio program on Talk Radio Network throughout much of the 2000s.

In 2003, Bruce was appointed to serve on Governor Arnold Schwarzenegger's transition team after his successful recall election against Gray Davis.

In 2009, after President Barack Obama and his family had moved into the White House, Bruce said, "we've got trash in the White House."

Bruce returned to Talk Radio Network in November 2012 as a guest host during the move of The Laura Ingraham Show from TRN to Courtside Entertainment Group.. In 2014, Bruce created a short video for the conservative YouTube channel Prager University in which she summarized her criticisms of the contemporary feminist movement.

Bruce was the subject of controversy in May 2017, when appearing as a guest on Fox News show Tucker Carlson Tonight. She criticized an autistic child for asking Vice President Mike Pence for an apology when he accidentally brushed the young boy in the face. She later apologized on air.

In December 2018, Bruce appeared on Fox News to criticize the decision of one Scottish coffee shop to call "gingerbread men" "gingerbread people". Bruce said, "obviously, they're men". She characterized the decision by the coffee shop as "the tipping point" in policing free speech.

Bruce is a Fox News contributor. In 2019, she became the host of Get Tammy Bruce, which airs on the Fox Nation streaming service.

Personal life
In a 2006 interview with C-SPAN, Bruce stated she was bisexual, and that for her, identifying as a lesbian was a choice. In an earlier speech, she identified herself as a pro-choice lesbian.

At the age of 17, Bruce became lovers with 34-year-old Brenda Benet. Later, Bruce and Benet lived together for nearly a year before Bruce moved out. On April 7, 1982, two years after they had first met and two weeks after Bruce moved out, Benet committed suicide at her home during a lunch date with Bruce.

Books

Films
Bruce made her film debut in the short feature film 2081, an independent film based on Kurt Vonnegut's short story "Harrison Bergeron." Bruce plays the role of Diana Moon Glampers, the United States Handicapper General in a technologically advanced, totalitarian-egalitarian state. Bruce also starred in a supporting role in the 2011 documentary The Undefeated.

References

External links
 
 
 

Living people
American columnists
American women columnists
American feminist writers
American political commentators
American political writers
American abortion-rights activists
American conservative talk radio hosts
American women radio presenters
American women's rights activists
American writers of Italian descent
Female critics of feminism
Fox News people
Individualist feminists
Lesbian feminists
American lesbian writers
American LGBT broadcasters
LGBT people from California
LGBT Christians
Tea Party movement activists
University of Southern California alumni
Writers from Los Angeles
The Washington Times people
Activists from California
LGBT conservatism in the United States
21st-century American women writers
1962 births